The Diocese of Phoenix  is a Roman Catholic ecclesiastical territory or diocese in the state of Arizona in the United States. It was established on December 2, 1969, when it was split off from the Diocese of Tucson. Its jurisdiction includes Maricopa, Mohave, Yavapai, and Coconino counties (excluding the territorial boundaries of the Navajo Nation), and also includes the Gila River Indian Reservation in Pinal County. The incumbent Bishop is John P. Dolan. The Diocese of Phoenix is a suffragan diocese of the ecclesiastical province of Santa Fe.

History

Early history
Jesuit priests began to work in northern Mexico in the 1610s in the lowlands near the coast. Originally, these missionaries worked out a peaceful compromise with the people of the Yaqui River valley allowing for the establishment of more than fifty mission settlements. This broke down when the Jesuits opposed the native shamanic religious tradition. The Opata people were more receptive to the missionaries and allied with them. After this, the Jesuits began to move into Pima and Tohono O'odham territories in present-day Arizona. Spanish exploration and missionary work was sufficient to consider the territory part of New Spain. An agreement between General Pedro de Perea and the viceroy of New Spain resulted in the general shaping of the province, initially called Nueva Navarra in 1637, but renamed Sonora in 1648.

The most famous missionary of what is now the American Southwest was Eusebio Kino. He arrived in the province of Nueva Navarra in 1687 and started missionary work in the Pimería Alta area. He began his first mission at Cucurpe, then established churches and missions in other villages such as Los Remedios, Imuris, Magdalena, Cocóspera, San Ignacio, Tubutama and Caborca. To develop an economy for the natives, Father Kino also taught them European farming techniques.

20th century

21st century
In 2009 the Diocese contributed $50,000 to the successful campaign by Stand For Marriage Maine to overturn an impending legalization of same-sex civil marriage in Maine.

On June 11, 2014, the diocese was "stunned and deeply saddened" at an attack on two priests during a burglary at Mater Misericordiae Mission in Phoenix. Parochial vicar Rev. Kenneth Walker, FSSP, 28, ordained a priest just two years, was fatally shot. Rev. Joseph Terra, FSSP, was wounded.

On October 13, 2017, marking the 100th Anniversary of the last apparition of Our Lady of Fatima, Bishop Omstead consecrated the diocese to the Immaculate Heart of Mary.

Sex abuse scandals
On August 4, 2017, it was announced that a civil lawsuit was filed against Thomas J. O'Brien, who served as Bishop of the Catholic Diocese of Phoenix between the years 1982 to 2003, O'Brien is accused of having sexually molested a boy on several occasions at parishes in Phoenix and Goodyear from 1977 to 1982. O'Brien died on August 26, 2018, following complications from Parkinson's Disease.

In June 2019, Joseph J. Henn, a former priest, was extradited from Italy to face charges of molestation in Phoenix. He had been laicized and expelled from the Salvatorian order in 2006.

On February 25, 2020, indicted Diocese of Phoenix priest Thomas Spaulding, who was accused of sexually abusing at least two boys in Maricopa County, died awaiting trial. Spaulding, who was 75 years old when he died, was charged in January 2020 with six counts of sexual misconduct and one charge of child molestatation.

In December 2020, a sex abuse lawsuit was filed against the Diocese of Phoenix. Among the accusations made in this lawsuit was the constant transfer of accused Diocese of Phoenix clergy out of the state of Arizona.

Media
The diocese uses several types of media to fulfill its evangelization efforts:

Radio ministry

Radio Family Rosary is a radio ministry of the Diocese of Phoenix founded in 1983. The station begins with a recitation of the rosary every day. After the rosary the station focus on a particular saint, or a point of catechism is held.  The station was founded by Dorothy Westfall, after a suggestion from a Phoenix parishioner suffering from arthritis.

Bishop Thomas Olmsted often uses radio communication and has a website with information about his "bishop's hour." on Immaculate Heart Radio.

The diocese began financially supporting En Familia radio KIDR in 2012 to reach out to those who speak Spanish.

Newspaper 

The Catholic Sun is the official newspaper of the Diocese of Phoenix.
The paper is delivered to more than 115,000 homes in the counties of Coconino, Maricopa, Mohave,  and Yavapai.

Television 

Mass is broadcast live from Cathedral of Saints Simon and Jude each Sunday morning by KAZT, along with a show immediately following entitled "Catholics Matter". The Mass was once on KUTP.

Social media
The diocese has an active presence on YouTube, Flickr, Facebook, Twitter and others and continues to expand its presence online.

Bishops 
The list of bishops of the diocese and their tenure of service:

Bishops of Phoenix
 Edward Anthony McCarthy (1969–1976), appointed Coadjutor Archbishop and later Archbishop of Miami
 James Steven Rausch (1977–1981)
 Thomas O'Brien (1982–2003)
 Thomas Olmsted (2003–2022)
 John P. Dolan (2022–present)

Auxiliary Bishops
 Eduardo Nevares (2010–present)

Priests from the Diocese who became Bishops
 James Sean Wall, appointed Bishop of Gallup in 2009

Statistics

According to 2019 data from the diocesan web site, the Diocese of Phoenix reported these statistics:

 Estimated Catholic Individuals.....1,225,677
 Estimated Catholic Households....296,652
 Diocesan Priests (including retired, sick, or absent).....138
 Extern Priests.....78
 Religious Priests.....93
 Permanent Deacons.....222
 Religious Brothers.....7
 Religious Sisters.....134
 Seminarians.....40
 Parishes.....94
 Missions.....23
 Catholic Cemeteries.....6
 Catholic Funeral Homes.....2
 High Schools (Diocesan and Private)...7
 Elementary Schools.......29
 Pre-Schools..........29

Parishes and Missions

Maricopa County
Our Lady of Guadalupe Mission, Aguila
St. Rose Philippine Duchesne Church, Anthem
St. Thomas Aquinas Church, Avondale
St. Philip Benizi Mission, Black Canyon City
St. Henry Church, Buckeye
Our Lady of Joy Church, Carefree
St. William Church, Cashion
St. Gabriel the Archangel, Cave Creek
St. Andrew the Apostle Church, Chandler
St. Mary Church, Chandler
St. Columba Kim Korean Church, Chandler
Santa Teresita Church, El Mirage
Ascension Church, Fountain Hills
St. Michael Mission, Gila Bend
St. Anne Church, Gilbert
St. Mary Magdalene Church, Gilbert
Our Lady of Perpetual Help Church, Glendale
St. Helen Church, Glendale
St. James Church, Glendale
St. Louis the King Church, Glendale
St. Raphael Church, Glendale
St. Thomas More Church, Glendale
St. John Vianney Church, Goodyear
Our Lady of Guadalupe Church, Guadalupe
St. John the Baptist Church, Komatke Gila River Indian Community Mission
All Saints Church, Mesa
Christ the King Church, Mesa
Holy Cross Church, Mesa
Queen of Peace Church, Mesa
St. Bridget Church, Mesa
St. Timothy Church, Mesa
All Saints Catholic Newman Center, Tempe ASU
Good Shepherd Mission, New River
St. Charles Borromeo Church, Peoria
Cathedral of Saints Simon and Jude, Phoenix
Corpus Christi Church, Phoenix
Holy Family Church, Phoenix
Immaculate Heart of Mary Church, Phoenix
Most Holy Trinity Church, Phoenix
Our Lady of Czestochowa Polish Church, Phoenix
Our Lady of the Valley Church, Phoenix
Sacred Heart Church, Phoenix
St. Agnes Church, Phoenix
St. Anthony Church, Phoenix
St. Augustine Church, Phoenix
St. Benedict Church, Phoenix
St. Catherine of Siena Church, Phoenix
St. Edward the Confessor Church, Phoenix
St. Francis Xavier Church, Phoenix
St. Gregory Church, Phoenix
St. Jerome Church, Phoenix
St. Joan of Arc Church, Phoenix
St. Joseph Church, Phoenix
St. Luke Church, Phoenix
St. Mark Church, Phoenix
St. Martin de Porres Church, Phoenix
St. Mary's Basilica, Phoenix
Mater Misericordiae Mission Tridentine Latin Masses, Phoenix
St. Matthew Church, Phoenix
St. Paul Church, Phoenix
St. Theresa Church, Phoenix
St. Thomas the Apostle Church, Phoenix
St. Vincent de Paul Church, Phoenix
Vietnamese Martyrs Church, Phoenix
Our Lady of Fatima Mission, Phoenix
Our Lady of Guadalupe Church, Queen Creek
St. Dominic Mission, Rio Verde
St. Francis of Assisi Mission, Salt River Pima-Maricopa Indian Community
St. Paschal Baylon Chapel, Salt River Pima-Maricopa Indian Community
San Lucy Mission, San Lucy Village of the Tohono O'odham Nation, Gila Bend
Blessed Sacrament Church, Scottsdale
Our Lady of Perpetual Help Church, Scottsdale
Our Lady of the Angels Conventual Franciscan Church and Renewal Center, Scottsdale, a ministry of the OFM Franciscan Province of Saint Barbara
St. Bernadette Church, Scottsdale
St. Bernard of Clairvaux Church, Scottsdale
St. Daniel the Prophet Church, Scottsdale
St. Maria Goretti Church, Scottsdale
St. Patrick Church, Scottsdale
St. Clement of Rome Church, Sun City
St. Elizabeth Seton Church, Sun City
St. Joachim and St. Anne Church, Sun City
Our Lady of Lourdes Church, Sun City West
Prince of Peace Church, Sun City West
St. Steven Church, Sun Lakes
St. Clare of Assisi Church, Surprise
All Saints Catholic Newman Center, Tempe ASU
Holy Spirit Church, Tempe
Our Lady of Mount Carmel Church, Tempe
Resurrection Church, Tempe
St. Margaret Church, Tempe
Blessed Sacrament Church, Tolleson
St. Anthony of Padua Church, Wickenburg

Pinal County
Gila River Indian Community Missions
St. Peter Mission, Bapchule
Holy Family Mission, Blackwater
St. Anthony Mission, Sacaton
Our Lady of Victory Mission, Sacaton Flats
St. Anne Mission, Santan
St. Catherine Mission, Santa Cruz
Ak-Chin Indian Community
St. Francis Mission

Yavapai County
St. Francis of Assisi Mission, Bagdad
St. Frances Cabrini Church, Camp Verde
St. Catherine Laboure Mission, Chino Valley
St. Cecelia Mission, Clarkdale
Good Shepherd of the Desert Mission, Congress
Immaculate Conception Church, Cottonwood
St. Joseph Mission, Mayer
Sacred Heart Church, Prescott
St. Germaine Church, Prescott Valley
St. John Vianney Church, Sedona

Coconino County
San Francisco de Asis, Flagstaff
Nativity of the Blessed Virgin Mary Chapel, Flagstaff
St. Pius X Center, Flagstaff
Our Lady of Guadalupe Chapel, Flagstaff
Holy Trinity Newman Center, Flagstaff NAU
El Cristo Rey Mission, Grand Canyon Village
Chapel of the Holy Cross, Sedona
St. Francis Church, Seligman
St. Joseph Church, Williams

Mohave County
St. Margaret Mary Church, Bullhead City
Our Lady of the Desert Mission, Dolan Springs
Our Lady of the Lake Church, Lake Havasu City
La Santisima Trinidad Mission, Littlefield and Scenic
St. Mary Church, Kingman

Schools
There are seven Catholic high-schools within the Diocese of Phoenix, 29 elementary schools, and 29 pre-schools. 
Benedictine University and the University of Mary offer degree programs within the Diocese of Phoenix, and the diocese operates campus ministry programs at Newman Centers for four public universities.

Congregations
As of 2020, twenty-eight communities of religious men and fifteen communities of religious women have a presence in the Diocese of Phoenix. A diocesan Office for Consecrated Life serves as a guide for members of religious communities and for persons interested in consecrated life in its various forms.

Cemeteries

See also

 Catholic Church by country
 Catholic Church in the United States
 Ecclesiastical Province of Santa Fe
 Global organisation of the Catholic Church
 Life Teen
 List of Roman Catholic archdioceses (by country and continent)
 List of Roman Catholic dioceses (alphabetical) (including archdioceses)
 List of Roman Catholic dioceses (structured view) (including archdioceses)
 List of the Catholic dioceses of the United States

References

External links 
 
 List of parishes
 Other Catholic Organizations in the Diocese of Phoenix
 Coat of arms of the bishop and of the diocese
 Office for Child and Youth Protection
 Arizona Catholic Conference
 "Bishop's Hour" radio program
  Catholic Charities Community Services Arizona
 "The Catholic Sun" newspaper
 Catholic Schools of the Diocese of Phoenix 
 United States Conference of Catholic Bishops

 
Phoenix
Phoenix
Diocese of Phoenix
Culture of Phoenix, Arizona
Christian organizations established in 1969
Phoenix